Sochchora is a genus of moths in the family Pterophoridae described by Francis Walker in 1864.

Species
Sochchora albipunctella T. B. Fletcher, 1911
Sochchora donatella Walker, 1864
Sochchora dotina Walsingham, 1915
Sochchora mulinus Gielis, 2006

Pterophorinae
Moth genera
Taxa named by Francis Walker (entomologist)